Cortland is an incorporated town in DeKalb County, Illinois, United States. The population was 4,398 at the 2020 Census. It was previously 4,270 at the 2010 census, up from 2,066 in 2000. Because of its status as an incorporated town, Cortland has adopted the slogan, "The Third Largest Town in Illinois". Only the towns of Cicero and Normal are larger, in terms of population.  Most municipalities in Illinois are defined as "cities" or "villages."

History
A post office called Cortland has been in operation since 1892. The town was named after Cortland, New York.

Geography
Cortland is located at  (41.924857, -88.693093).

The town is located immediately east of the city of DeKalb and just south of the city of Sycamore.

Demographics
As of the 2020 census there were 4,398 people, 1,419 households, and 939 families residing in the town. The racial makeup of the town was 73.72% White, 8.19% African American, 0.48% Native American, 1.39% Asian, 0.05% Pacific Islander, 5.82% from other races, and 10.37% from two or more races. Hispanic or Latino of any race were 17.03% of the population.

There were 1,419 households, out of which 64.69% had children under the age of 18 living with them, 51.30% were married couples living together, 6.77% had a female householder with no husband present, and 33.83% were non-families. 21.35% of all households were made up of individuals, and 5.85% had someone living alone who was 65 years of age or older. The average household size was 3.48 and the average family size was 3.00.

The town's age distribution consisted of 26.0% under the age of 18, 9.6% from 18 to 24, 40.9% from 25 to 44, 15.7% from 45 to 64, and 7.9% who were 65 years of age or older. The median age was 30.2 years. For every 100 females, there were 120.7 males. For every 100 females age 18 and over, there were 123.5 males.

The median income for a household in the town was $74,821, and the median income for a family was $98,984. Males had a median income of $51,393 versus $26,688 for females. The per capita income for the town was $32,578. About 0.6% of families and 4.5% of the population were below the poverty line, including 0.5% of those under age 18 and 3.3% of those age 65 or over.

Notable person

 Charles W. Nash (1864–1948), automobile industry entrepreneur, born in Cortland

References

External links
 History of Cortland, IL

1865 establishments in Illinois
Populated places established in 1865
Towns in DeKalb County, Illinois
Towns in Illinois